Arabinofuranan 3-O-arabinosyltransferase (AftC) is an enzyme with systematic name alpha-(1->5)-arabinofuranan:trans,octacis-decaprenylphospho-beta-D-arabinofuranose 3-O-alpha-D-arabinofuranosyltransferase. This enzyme catalyses the following chemical reaction:

 Adds an alpha-D-arabinofuranosyl group from trans,octacis-decaprenylphospho-beta-D-arabinofuranose at the 3-O-position of an alpha-(1->5)-arabinofuranan chain attached to a beta-(1->5)-galactofuranan chain

This enzyme is isolated from Mycobacterium smegmatis.

References

External links 

EC 2.4.2